Schefflera palmiformis is a species of plant in the family Araliaceae. It is endemic to Vietnam.  It is threatened by habitat loss.

References

palmiformis
Endemic flora of Vietnam
Trees of Vietnam
Endangered plants
Taxonomy articles created by Polbot